Lieutenant General Sir Charles Edmond Knox, KCB (28 February 1846 – 1 November 1938) was an Anglo-Irish soldier of the British Army.

Early life
Knox was the son of Robert Knox, DD, Archbishop of Armagh, and of his wife Catherine Delia FitzGibbon, daughter of Thomas Gibbon FitzGibbon of Ballyseeda, County Limerick. He had two brothers and two sisters. His great-grandfather, Thomas Knox (died 1818) of Dungannon Park, County Tyrone, had been created the first Viscount Northland.

He was educated at Eton and Sandhurst.

Career
On 30 June 1865, Knox was commissioned into the British Army's 85th Regiment of Foot (Bucks Volunteers) as an ensign by purchase. This later became the 2nd Battalion the King's Shropshire Light Infantry, and the whole of his regimental service was done in that corps. On 7 August 1867, he was promoted lieutenant by purchase, on 11 June 1876, captain in a death vacancy, and on 1 July 1883, major. He served under Sir Charles Warren in the Bechuanaland Expedition between 1884 and 1885 and while there raised and commanded the 4th Pioneer Regiment.  The expedition did not see any fighting but due to his performance Knox was promoted a brevet lieutenant colonel; brevet colonel on 9 December 1889; and he was promoted substantive lieutenant colonel on 11 February 1890, and was commanding officer of a battalion of his regiment from then to 11 February 1894. After a period of half-pay, he went on to command the 32nd Regimental District (Duke of Cornwall's Light Infantry) based in Bodmin, from 29 January 1895 to 29 November 1899, when he was promoted to temporary major general in command of an infantry brigade at Aldershot.

Just five days later, with the outbreak of the Boer War, Knox was given command of 13th Infantry Brigade on the mobilisation of the 6th Division under General Kelly-Kenny, which formed part of the South African Field Force. Following the Relief of Kimberley, he took part in the Battle of Paardeberg in February 1900, and was severely wounded by a gunshot in the chest. In March 1902, he was appointed to the command of the Bloemfontein garrison in the Orange River Colony. Following the end of the war in June that year, Knox returned to the United Kingdom in the SS Dunottar Castle, which arrived at Southampton in July 1902. For his services during the war, he was thrice Mentioned in Despatches, awarded the Queen's South Africa Medal and the King's South Africa Medal, promoted substantive major general (dated 4 December 1899), and knighted as a Knight Commander of the Order of the Bath (KCB) in the April 1901 South Arica Honours list (the order was dated to 29 November 1900, and he was only invested as such after his return home, by King Edward VII at Buckingham Palace on 24 October 1902).

After returning from the war, he was given command of 4th Division, 2nd Army Corps on 30 October 1902, stationed on Salisbury Plain. He was promoted lieutenant general on 6 December 1905, and relinquished command on 1 June 1906. He was offered the post of Governor of Bermuda, but declined on the grounds that he was unmarried.

He was appointed Colonel of the Regiment of the King's Shropshire Light Infantry on 6 January 1907 and continued to hold the post until January 1921, though he retired from active service on 10 May 1909.

He was a member of the Naval and Military Club. In retirement he served as a company chairman.

Knox died on 1 November 1938, his obituary in Time magazine dated 14 November 1938, reads:

That in The Times noted:

Notes

External links

1846 births
1938 deaths
People educated at Eton College
Knights Commander of the Order of the Bath
British Army personnel of the Second Boer War
Graduates of the Royal Military College, Sandhurst
King's Shropshire Light Infantry officers
British Army lieutenant generals
British military personnel of the Bechuanaland Expedition